"Emotional Girl" is a song co-written and recorded by Canadian country music artist Terri Clark. It was released in January 1997 as the second single from Clark's album Just the Same. The song reached number 1 on the RPM Country Tracks chart in March 1997 and number 10 on the Billboard Hot Country Singles & Tracks chart. It was written by Clark, Rick Bowles and Chris Waters.

Music video
The music video was directed by Michael Merriman and premiered in early 1997. The lead male in the video is actor Kevin Sizemore. It was filmed in Nashville, Tennessee.

Chart performance
"Emotional Girl" debuted at number 66 on the U.S. Billboard Hot Country Singles & Tracks for the week of January 11, 1997.

Year-end charts

References

1997 singles
Terri Clark songs
Songs written by Terri Clark
Songs written by Chris Waters
Song recordings produced by Keith Stegall
Mercury Nashville singles
Songs written by Rick Bowles
1996 songs